Iida or IIDA may refer to:

Iida, Nagano, Japan
Iida (surname)
International Interior Design Association, a professional networking and educational association committed to interior design